The GFF4 (Geschützte Führungs- und Funktionsfahrzeuge, Klasse 4: Protected Command and Functional Vehicles, Class 4), previously KMW Grizzly, is a medium weight MRAP armored personnel carrier, developed by Krauss-Maffei Wegmann (KMW), designed for operation with the German Army based on the 6x6 Trakker chassis from Iveco adapted to meet the needs of the German Army. It is being developed under the direction of the German Ministry of Defence Federal Office of Defense Technology and Procurement (Bundesamt für Wehrtechnik und Beschaffung).  The first vehicle will be delivered as early as November 2007.

The GFF4 is designed to meet the German Army's "Class 4" protected command and role-specific vehicles, with a gross vehicle weight of 25 tons, and transportable on the Airbus A400M aircraft. Currently, the German Army could use only the smaller 12.5 ton ATF Dingo 2 or the 33 ton Boxer MRAV.

Grizzly can carry 10 fully equipped troops, which exceeds by greater than 50% the 3 tons required by the German request for proposal (RFP). The vehicle is protected in all directions. The driver's station and crew compartment form an integral safety cell providing protection against improvised explosive devices (IEDs), projectiles, missiles and mines. The cell's frame also forms a rollcage. The engine compartment and transmission are armored to reduce the chance of a 'mobility kill' under attack.

KMW is offering the vehicle in several configurations, and since the design is based on a modular concept, a smaller 4x4 or larger 8x8 variant, with corresponding payloads are possible.

Operators

Current operators
: Unknown.
: 5 vehicles delivered from Italy (4x4 chassis variant from Iveco DV)
: Similar vehicle produced by Iveco DV with the 4x4 chassis variant. Called by Italian Army VTMM (Veicolo Tattico Medio Multiruolo; Medium Multirole Tactical Vehicles) "Orso" (Bear).  56 vehicles, 16 ambulance.

Military Vehicles of Similar Name
The KMW Grizzly, named after the North American Grizzly bear shares its name with several other military vehicles:
Blackwater USA Grizzly APC
AVGP Grizzly
Grizzly combat engineering vehicle, based on the M1 Abrams tank chassis

See also
 AGF (Light infantry vehicle)
 ATF Dingo
 BAE Caiman
 Boxer (Armoured Fighting Vehicle)
 LAPV Enok
 Mungo ESK
 Rheinmetall YAK

References

External links
 Krauss-Maffei Wegmann GFF4  - Prouct Website of the manufacturer

Off-road vehicles
Armoured fighting vehicles of the post–Cold War period
Armoured personnel carriers of Germany
Wheeled armoured personnel carriers
Post–Cold War military vehicles of Germany
Iveco vehicles
Military vehicles introduced in the 2000s
Armoured personnel carriers of the post–Cold War period